Thiago Santos de Melo (born 30 December 1991), known as Thiago Papel, also referred to as Trường An (in Vietnamese), is a Brazilian-Vietnamese footballer who currently plays as a defender for V.League 1 side Sông Lam Nghệ An.

Career statistics

Club

Notes

Achievements

Club
Quảng Nam
V.League 1:
 Winners : 2017

References

1991 births
Living people
Brazilian footballers
Brazilian expatriate footballers
Association football defenders
Guarani Esporte Clube (MG) players
Associação Atlética Coruripe players
Club Sportivo Sergipe players
Quang Nam FC players
Campeonato Brasileiro Série D players
V.League 1 players
Brazilian expatriate sportspeople in Vietnam
Expatriate footballers in Vietnam
Sportspeople from Sergipe